Jay Hayes (born 14 June 1957) is a Canadian equestrian. He competed at the 1992 Summer Olympics and the 2000 Summer Olympics.

References

External links
 

1957 births
Living people
Canadian male equestrians
Olympic equestrians of Canada
Equestrians at the 1992 Summer Olympics
Equestrians at the 2000 Summer Olympics
Sportspeople from Hartford, Connecticut